Natalya Borisovna Pochinok born Gribkova is a D.Sc. in Economic Sciences, professor, rector of Russian State Social University (on June 2, 2014 performed the duties in January 2015, elected to the post).

Biography
As a member of junior national teams of the USSR and the Russian Federation in athletics Natalia Pochinok won several international competitions in running from 1991 to 1994.

She holds two undergraduate academic degrees – in Economics (graduated from Plekhanov Russian University of Economics in 1997) and in Law (RSSU, 2002). In 2001 Natalya Pochinok defended her dissertation on “Taxes in the Mechanism of Foreign Investment Attraction in Russia”. In 2005 she was awarded an academic research degree Doctor of Sciences in Economics (topic of the postdoctoral dissertation “Taxes in the System of State Regulation of the Economy in Russia”).

Natalya Pochinok worked in the banking sector (Vice-President of Gazprombank, Director of the Southern Regional Branch of Raiffeisen Bank, Director of the Sberbank Office for Work with Regional Branches). From 1998 to 2005 she was a lecturer in the Tax Policy Department of Plekhanov Russian University of Economics. From 2011 to 2014 Natalia Pochinok served there as a professor and the Head of the Taxes and Taxation Department.

From June 2, 2014 she performed the duties of the rector of Russian State Social University after being appointed by the Ministry of Education and Science of the Russian Federation. In January 2015, Pochinok was elected rector of RSSU according to the results of voting by the members of the RSSU Conference of Scientific and Pedagogical Workers and Students.

Her research interests focus on pensions, fiscal and tax policies, social aspects of the economy; social entrepreneurship and customer-oriented service model of social services are of particular interest.
From April 2016 onwards serves a member of the Civic Chamber of Moscow.

From 2017 serves as the Chairman of the Commission on Social Policy, Labor Relations, Cooperation with Trade Unions and Veterans Support.
Natalya   Pochinok has over fifteen years’ pedagogical experience.

She was married to the former Minister of Labor and Social Development, Alexander Pochinok. She has two sons.

In November 2021, Pochinok was dismissed from the post of rector of the RSSU.

References

External links
 Двадцать лет спустя

1976 births
Living people
Academic staff of Russian State Social University
Plekhanov Russian University of Economics alumni
Academic staff of the Plekhanov Russian University of Economics
Economists from Moscow
Russian women economists
Russian jurists
Russian State Social University alumni